The Kosyam Palace is the official residence of the president of Burkina Faso. It is located in Ouaga 2000, an upper-middle-class neighborhood in southeastern Ouagadougou. It was dedicated in 2005.

The architect behind its construction is Michel I. Tshibuabua. He was a Congolese pan-Africanist architect that have established many structures on the continent, especially in Gabon where he started his career under President Omar Bongo

References

Buildings and structures in Ouagadougou
Buildings and structures completed in 2005
Presidential residences
2005 establishments in Burkina Faso